Hugh Alexander Bryson (August 21, 1912 – October 13, 1987) was a Canadian politician, farmer and insurance agent. He was elected to the House of Commons of Canada in the 1953 election as a Member of the Co-operative Commonwealth Federation to represent the riding of Humboldt—Melfort. He was re-elected in the 1957 election then defeated in the elections of 1958 and for the riding of Humboldt—Melfort—Tisdale in 1962.

External links
 

1912 births
1987 deaths
Co-operative Commonwealth Federation MPs
Members of the House of Commons of Canada from Saskatchewan
New Democratic Party candidates for the Canadian House of Commons
Place of death missing